Vincenzo Alberto Annese (born 22 September 1984) is an Italian professional football manager and former player. He is the current head coach of the Nepal national team.

Being born and having started his coaching career in Italy, Annese managed teams in Latvia, Ghana, West Bank, Indonesia, Belize, Kosovo and India. He won two consecutive I-League titles with Gokulam Kerala.

Early life 
Annese wanted to follow in the footsteps of his father, a former football player for Molfetta Sportiva, and joined the Os Belenenses youth team. Annese began his football career as a midfielder for Venezia youth side. He later played for local clubs Martina Franca, Noicattaro and Leonessa Altamura. 

After a brief playing career, Annese shifted his focus to coaching, He attended the Higher Institute of Physical Education (ISEF) at the Università degli studi di Foggia and University of Verona, focussing on the adaptation of sports to disabled people.

Coaching career

Early career 
Annese started his professional coaching career in Fidelis Andria youth team in 2010. In 2013, he joined Foggia as coaching staff in 2012–13 Lega Pro Prima Divisione and 2013–14 Lega Pro Prima Divisione. From 2015 to 2016, he was a technical coach with Armenia at various youth international levels.

Bechem United 
In January 2017, Annese joined Ghanaian Premier League club Bechem United as the head coach for 2017 season. Under him the club became 2017 Ghana Super Cup runner-up.

Ahli Al-Khaleel 
On 25 July 2017, Annese joined West Bank Premier League club Ahli Al-Khaleel on a one-year deal as the head coach. He lead the club to finals of 2016–17 Palestine Cup and 2017 West Bank Super Cup.

PSIS Semarang 
On 24 March 2018, Annese joined Liga 1 club PSIS Semarang as the head coach for 2018 season.

Belize 
On 17 June 2019, Annese signed a one-year contract with Belize national football team as the head coach.

Gokulam Kerala 
On 19 August 2020, Annese joined I-League club Gokulam Kerala. Under him, the club won their maiden I-League title in 2020–21 season and qualified for the 2022 AFC Cup group stage.

Annese created history in the I-League with longest unbeaten streak of 21 games. The previous record-holder was Churchill Brothers, who held it for 17 games (from February 20, 2009 to January 22, 2010). Under him Gokulam Kerala won the 2021–22 I-League title, became the first club to win consecutive I-League titles. He received 2021–22 I-League Best Coach award

At the 2022 AFC Cup group stage opener, Gokulam Kerala achieved a historic 4–2 win against Indian Super League club ATK Mohun Bagan.

On June 1, 2022 Annese announced that he won't be continuing with Gokulam Kerala.

NorthEast United 
On 8 December 2022, Annese joined Indian Super League club NorthEast United as the new head coach after the club sacked Marco Balbul mid-season.

Nepal 
On 1 March 2023, the All Nepal Football Association announced him as the country's head coach after the departure of Abdullah Almutairi and the post being vacant for months.

Managerial statistics

Honours

Manager 
Bechem United
 Ghana Super Cup: 2017

Ahli Al-Khaleel
 Palestine Cup runner-up: 2016–17 
 West Bank Super Cup runner-up: 2017

Gokulam Kerala
 I-League: 2020–21, 2021–22

Individual
 Syed Abdul Rahim Award (I-League Best Coach):  2021–22

References

External links 

1984 births
Living people
Italian footballers
Association football midfielders
Italian football managers
Italian expatriate football managers
S.S. Fidelis Andria 1928 managers
Calcio Foggia 1920 managers
Gokulam Kerala FC managers
NorthEast United FC head coaches
Belize national football team managers
Expatriate football managers in Estonia
Expatriate football managers in Armenia
Expatriate football managers in Latvia
Expatriate football managers in Ghana
Expatriate football managers in the State of Palestine
Expatriate football managers in Indonesia
Expatriate football managers in India
Italian expatriate sportspeople in Belize
Italian expatriate sportspeople in Indonesia
Italian expatriate sportspeople in the State of Palestine
Italian expatriate sportspeople in Ghana
Italian expatriate sportspeople in Armenia
Italian expatriate sportspeople in Estonia
Italian expatriate sportspeople in Latvia
Italian expatriate sportspeople in India
Italian expatriate sportspeople in Kosovo
Expatriate football managers in Kosovo
Expatriate football managers in Nepal
Nepal national football team managers